Cleopatra Broumand Birrenbach is a Persian-American designer, innovator, conceptualist, and entrepreneur in the apparel and related industries. Her international upbringing, education, and keen knowledge of several languages enabled her to develop a broad global network of personal and business contacts who called upon her intricate technical designing capacity to develop workable solutions.  In return for the opportunities America has offered her, Birrenbach is a successful fundraiser for various human causes, supporter of the fine arts and culinary world. She is driven by her deep conviction for the empowerment and emancipation of women worldwide.

Early life 
Born in Tehran, Iran, she is the youngest of six children: Hormoz, Dariush, Fereshteh, Keykavous and Cyrus. Her father, Khalil Broumand, was a businessman in the oil industry in Russia. He returned to Iran after the Bolshevik revolution and started a new life. Her mother Farangis, a graduate of American School in Iran, named her after watching Claudette Colbert play the Egyptian queen in a classic movie. At 8 years old, she announced to her mother her intentions of becoming a fashion designer. Insisting that she wanted to become the next Christian Dior, young Birrenbach enrolled in design and sewing classes. Her father, who had a penchant for things American, sent 15-year-old Cleopatra to live with her older brother who had earlier moved to Indianapolis, Indiana.

Starting anew in Indianapolis, Birrenbach attended Pike High School and at 17, claiming her individuality, she wrote her own Declaration of Independence to her father, brothers, and the patriarchal society at large. Following her high school graduation, she moved to New York City to study design at the Fashion Institute of Technology. Before graduating from FIT, 21- year old Birrenbach established her first fashion business, Cleopatra Broumand Boutique, Inc., designing and manufacturing ready-to-wear women's fashion.

Career

Early success 
Birrenbach's early designs reflected both her continued quest for emancipation and her Persian origins. Her father's Persian Abba, a square shaped garment with armholes traditionally worn by men, was the inspiration for her initial collection and one of her most popular womenswear and menswear given its powerful, opulent look and freedom of movement.

Buyers were drawn to her marriage of Eastern wisdom and Western practicality, and her designs were sought out by the likes of Neiman Marcus, Saks Fifth Avenue, Henri Bendel, and Bergdorf Goodman, which was the first to display her designs in their windows four times in the same year. At the same time, she launched Cleopatra Coffee, her own special blend packaged with a Persian coffee maker which sold at Neiman Marcus, Bloomingdale's and B. Altman's. (She is credited with producing one of the first designer food products). In the late 1960s, Cleopatra's buyers and private customers were invited to a miniature museum of Persian artifacts, where she would read their fortune from their coffee grounds.

Having learned how to cook especially northern Persian delicacies from her mother, Birrenbach considers cooking an art form. In early 1974, she was featured in Craig Claiborne's Favorites from the New York Times, published by Times Books. Bareh Maveh (lamb with fruits), Abgushteh Limon (lemon soup), Fosenjohn (duck and meatballs in walnut and pomegranate sauce), and Chello (plain rice with saffron) were among the featured dishes she prepared. In 2000, she became a member of the International Association of Culinary Professionals by invitation of its co-founder, Julia Child.

International work 
In 1972, Cleopatra married Thomas Birrenbach, a steel company executive with the German Thyssen Group. He is the son of Dr. Kurt Birrenbach, Chairman of the Supervisory Board of the Thyssen Group (today ThyssenKrupp) and Member of the German Bundestag (Parliament). As special advisor and emissary of Chancellor Ludwig Erhard, he is credited with having established in 1965 the diplomatic relations between the State of Israel and the Federal Republic of Germany. See “Meine Sondermissionen” by Kurt Birrenbach, published by ECON Verlag Duesseldorf in 1984. Thomas’ mother was Ida Wangemann Birrenbach from Münster, Germany. Birrenbach spent the next ten years living and working around the world, in China, Germany, India, Italy, Iran, Japan, Russia, and Scotland. Aided by her knowledge of several languages, Birrenbach became a global fashion influence.

While residing in Germany, she launched Cyrus International, a Swiss-based consulting company advising American and European firms on marketing and operations in Iran.

At the request of the Thyssen Group of companies, Birrenbach accompanied her husband to Tehran to further develop the ongoing construction of Iranian oil and gas refineries and the acquisition of other major capital goods projects. Time spent in Iran covered the period before, during and after the Iranian Revolution.
In 1977, at the request of her mentor Shirley Goodman, Executive Vice President of FIT, and under the auspices of Empress Farah Pahlavi of Iran, Cleopatra directed the establishment of a FIT-subsidiary in Tehran. Because of the ensuing revolutionary turmoil this historic development did not come to fruition.

At their Tehran residence in October 1977, the Birrenbachs introduced U.S. Vice President Nelson Rockefeller and Happy Rockefeller, who were on a visit for the opening of the Museum of Contemporary Art in Tehran, to Iranian-American artist Marcos Grigorian. This introduction led to the acquisition of several of his artworks. Mr. Rockefeller eventually donated one of Grigorian's "Earthworks" to the Museum of Modern Art in New York City.

In 1979, the Chinese government invited her to high-level talks in Beijing as an advisor to the National China Textile Corporation on state-of-the-art technology and marketing know-how available in the United States.

On December 10, 1987, General Secretary Mikhail Gorbachev hosted a dinner in honor of President and Mrs. Ronald Reagan at the Soviet Embassy in Washington D.C. On this occasion, Cleopatra was introduced to Foreign Minister Eduard Shevardnadze who, in the spirit of Glasnost (Openness) and Perestroika (Restructuring), took a vivid interest in her line of work and invited her and her husband to a series of fact finding visits to Moscow, Leningrad, Tbilisi, Tashkent, etc. Based on her experience in China the purpose was to assess the needs of the antiquated textile and garment factories and to introduce western merchandising and marketing strategies to the Russian Ministry of Light Industries and Textiles. Following numerous countrywide visits, she presented proposals for their modernization. In the late 1980s, as advisor to the project “Russia in the World of Fashion,” she conducted negotiations with the Ministry of Culture, the Director of the Hermitage Museum in St. Petersburg, and the Vice-Chairman of the Cultural Foundation of Russia, helping Russia to become a contender in international fashion.

In 1989, as Artistic Liaison together with Tair Salakhov, contemporary artist and First Secretary of the USSR Artists’ Union, she initiated and coordinated the first art exchange between the USSR and the Santa Fe Chamber Music Festival an art exhibition related to the legacy of renown Russian composer and artist Dmitri Shostakovich (1906-1975).

In 1987 Scottish knitting manufacturer Peter Scott praised her for “having advanced their industry a decade in technology.”

In her travels, she not only influenced global manufacturing based on Western practices, but returned with Eastern goods and inspirations. She spearheaded a collaboration between Empress Farah and Vice President Nelson Rockefeller on the reproduction of antique Persian jewelries and artifacts for the American market. The Iranian Revolution impeded such development.

With the Indian Government and non-governmental manufacturers, she  developed and jointly produced lines of beadings, embroideries, and silks for the United States market.

Re-emergence as a prominent designer 
In 1983, upon returning to the United States, Birrenbach re-emerged as one of America's innovative designers on New York's Seventh Avenue and launched her classic, timeless, and colorful collections of women's ready-to-wear, eveningwear, menswear, and accessories in the designer and couture categories.  
As CEO of Cleopatra Broumand, Inc., her second fashion venture, she presided over a diversified operation with productions in Italy and the Far East, distributing to two hundred top specialty stores and boutiques throughout America, Europe, and Japan. 
Cleopatra's Fall '83 collection was based on an ancient “Sun Man” mask and “Lady Sun,” as well as starbursts and crescent moons. All her silk prints were computer designed and produced in the Como region of Italy by producers such as: Etro, Corisia, Taroni, etc. Her Cashmeres and Alpaca were from Loro Piana and Agnona.

For her Fall '84 collection, she drew inspiration from contemporary artist Marcos Grigorian's “Earth Work” revealing its cracks  and from German Zero Group artist Adolf Luther's “Light and Matter”(Licht+Materie) coil motif.  A computer design knitted face with red lips and an asymmetrical collar on the sweaters were among other popular designs in the collection. Her evening designs included quilted silk jackets, pleated skirts, and lightly embroidered silk shirts. In this same season, with the cracked earth and coil motives, she premiered a collection of men's sweaters after actor Paul Newman inquired about menswear while attending an earlier womenswear trunk show and personal appearance in Beverly Hills.
Her Fall '85 collection drew inspiration from the Houghton Shahnameh or Book of Kings, 16th century miniature illustrations of 10th century Persian writer Ferdowsi's poetry. A sweater from this collection was included in a time capsule placed at New York Marriott Marquis' grand opening ceremony on October 8, 1985.

Reminiscent of her earlier designs, garments inspired by the medieval world reflected Birrenbach's continued quest for emancipation and empowerment. The sword, falcon, and metallic glint of armor appeared in her Fall '86 designs which retained their softness in their knitted and silk textures or delicate embroidery as the breastplate inspired pieces did.

Press publications across the United States deemed “Cleopatra's woman a woman of tomorrow with yesterday's romance”  and credited her ability to marry the modern with the exotic.

Bergdorf Goodman, Neiman Marcus, Saks Fifth Avenue, Bloomingdale's, Barneys, Takashimaya, Henri Bendel, Nordstrom, Bullocks Wilshire, etc. are among the stores which carried her line.

Celebrity clients included the likes of Jacqueline Kennedy Onassis, Gloria Swanson, Elizabeth Taylor, Joan Collins, Linda Evans, Whitney Houston, Jill St. John, Yue-Sai Kan, Elena Obraztsova, Shirley MacLaine, Oprah Winfrey, Marlon Brando, Paul Newman, Luciano Pavarotti, as well as prominent personalities from the world of business and politics.

Humanitarian Work 
Following the Armenian earthquake of 1988, she became founder and director of the Children of Crisis Foundation in Washington, D.C., the first Russian/American foundation. In April 1989, per Birrenbach's suggestion, a three-day auction of one million dollars worth of her clothing and scarves, inaugurated by Liana Dubinin, wife of the USSR Ambassador to Washington, opened at the Madison Hotel in Washington D.C. benefiting the Armenian Children Relief Fund.

In 1996, contribution from proceeds of a trunk sale in Park City, Utah went to the Huntsman Cancer Foundation.

Awards 
In 1989, she was honored with an Order of Merit award by the Supreme Soviet and Council of Ministers of the Armenian SSR in recognition for her charitable contribution. The ceremony took place at the Russian Embassy in Washington, D.C. President Ronald Reagan was among the recipients.

Member of the International Research Council, Near East Museum of Ancient and Contemporary Art, The Marcos and Sabrina Grigorian Collection (Yerevan, Armenia).

Personal life 
Birrenbach currently resides in New York City with her husband Thomas. She is developing a lifestyle program called “You Are What You Eat, You Wear What You Are” which emphasizes the synergy between food and fashion in hopes for a healthier, cleaner, organic, sustainable world. She is also developing new food items, among them a doughless, gluten free pizza.

References 

1944 births
Living people
Iranian fashion designers
Iranian women fashion designers
American fashion designers
American women fashion designers
Businesspeople from Tehran
21st-century American women